LDV Group Limited, formerly Leyland DAF Vans, was a British van manufacturer based in Washwood Heath, Birmingham. Historically part of Rover Group and Leyland DAF, it was later a wholly owned subsidiary of the Russian GAZ Group. Owing to the global recession and a lack of long-term investment, production was suspended at the LDV factory in December 2008.

After a series of failed rescue attempts, the intellectual property rights were sold by administrators PricewaterhouseCoopers to Eco Concept in 2009, who sold them to SAIC Motor in 2010, with its Maxus subsidiary commencing production in China in March 2011.

History

LDV was formed in April 1993 as Leyland DAF Vans, following a management buyout backed by 3i of DAF NV's Leyland DAF van manufacturing division, following the Dutch company being placed in administration. It was rebranded as LDV in January 1994.<ref name=EC>State aid NN/41/2009 - Rescue Aid for LDV Group Limited European Commission 7 August 2009</ref>

Prior to its merger with Leyland Trucks and DAF Trucks in February 1987, it was part of the British Leyland/Rover Group empire, and was latterly the Freight Rover arm of the Land Rover Group division.

In December 2005, after going into administration, LDV was bought by group Sun Capital Partners, and was subject to a financial restructuring. What Van?'' reported LDV's commitment to its existing customers, including an assurance from their marketing director that their production target of 1,000 vans per month would put them well above break even point.

The Russian GAZ Group acquired LDV on 31 July 2006. Former Ford of Europe executive Martin Leach and former AT Kearney executive Steve Young were appointed to run the business and expand production at LDV's Birmingham plant by adding new product lines and entering new markets in Europe and elsewhere.

GAZ had plans to export LDV technology to Russia, and start producing the Maxus, at the plant of  GAZ Nizhny Novgorod in Russia, with 50,000 as an initial volume. There were also proposals to export the GAZ Maxus to Australia, a traditional market for British Leyland.

However, GAZ's plans never really showed any increased output, and due to the severe worldwide recession and a lack of long-term investment and commitment, production was suspended at the LDV factory in Birmingham in December 2008. After the British Government tried once again to save the company by agreeing to pour in £5 million of grants to enable Malaysia's WestStar Corporation to purchase LDV. WestStar failed to secure financing.

The intellectual property rights were sold by administrators PricewaterhouseCoopers to Chinese firm Eco Concept on 15 October 2009, who sold them to SAIC Motor in August  2010, with Maxus commencing production in China in March 2011.

Coincidentally, PWC were the same group of administrators who dealt with the demise of the MG Rover Group in 2005, the descendant of the original company Leyland Trucks was a part of. Also, SAIC Motor currently owns the rights to most of MG Rover's assets, reuniting the two companies.

Vehicles
LDV produced a range of panel vans, pick ups and minibuses, all available with various modifications and specifications. LDV's main customers were large British corporations, such as Royal Mail, National Grid plc and many other utility companies, which were politically persuaded to buy British built vehicles.

200/400 Series The plant produced what was known as the 200 and 400 Series vans, inside the plant these were known as the K2 and 210 respectively. After the factory went into receivership in 1993, and a management backed buyout headed by Allan Amey, the 200 and 400 were given a facelift on the existing chassis, and renamed Pilot and Convoy.

Convoy/Pilot
Until 2006, LDV produced the Convoy and Pilot, derived from the British Leyland Sherpa, and developed considerably throughout the 1970s to 1990s, and which were a common sight in the United Kingdom.

Cub
Between 1998 and 2001, LDV sold the Cub, a badge engineered Nissan Vanette Cargo. In June 1998, LDV entered into an agreement with Nissan, to sell a re branded version of the Nissan Serena MPV based Vanette Cargo.

Maxus
The last range of vans, the Maxus, was introduced in the end of 2004. The Maxus was originally planned as a joint venture with Daewoo Motors of South Korea. Daewoo however, went into receivership in November 2000, before the project came to fruition.

LDV subsequently acquired the exclusive rights to the van from General Motors, who had taken over Daewoo, and purchased the existing tooling and shipped it all to Birmingham from the Daewoo Plant in Poland where the van was originally intended to be built. The Maxus was fitted with direct injection, common rail, diesel engines supplied by VM Motori.

Sponsorships
LDV sponsored:
Aston Villa Football Club from 1998 to 2000 
St Mirren Football Club from 2000 to 2003 
the EFL Trophy from 2000 to 2006

References

External links

Vehicle manufacturing companies disestablished in 2009
Defunct motor vehicle manufacturers of England
Defunct companies based in Birmingham, West Midlands
GAZ
 
Manufacturing companies based in Birmingham, West Midlands
Vehicle manufacturing companies established in 1993
1993 establishments in England
2009 disestablishments in England
3i Group companies